The Roman goose is an Italian breed of domestic goose. It is said to be one of the oldest breeds of goose, bred more than 2000 years ago and originally sacred to the goddess Juno.

History

Sometime in the late 4th century BC, as the Gauls attempted to sneak into Rome under cover of night, it is said that the honking of Roman geese alerted the Romans and saved the capitol. In honour of this, the Romans later founded a temple to Juno, to whom the geese were considered sacred. Geese were also revered in the supplicia canum annual sacrifice.

Uses
In the modern period, it is kept for a range of purposes such as for meat and eggs depending on location. It is a popular exhibition breed in North America, where it is more commonly known as the tufted Roman goose and possesses a crest. In Europe, it is primarily kept as a utility meat breed, while in Australia, they are used for both purposes. Crests are optional in Europe and Australia.

Eggs 
Roman geese can live up to 25 years and lay between 25 and 35 eggs per year. An egg takes 28 to 30 days for incubation.

See also
Guard goose
List of goose breeds

References

Goose breeds
Goose breeds originating in Italy
Juno (mythology)